The Committee on Banking and Currency could refer to:
 the United States House Committee on Banking and Currency, which existed from 1865 to 1968.
 the United States Senate Committee on Banking and Currency, which existed from 1913 to 1970.